Guadalupe Municipality may refer to several municipalities of Mexican states:

 Guadalupe Municipality, Chihuahua
 Guadalupe Municipality, Nuevo León
 Guadalupe Municipality, Oaxaca
 Guadalupe Municipality, Puebla
 Guadalupe Municipality, Zacatecas

See also
Guadalupe y Calvo Municipality, Chihuahua
Guadalupe Victoria Municipality, Durango
San Juan de Guadalupe Municipality, Durango

Municipality name disambiguation pages